Saint Louis Public School District (SLPS) is the school district that operates public schools in the City of St. Louis, Missouri (but not St. Louis County, which is an entity independent of the city).

History

Beginnings
The act of the United States Congress that created the Missouri Territory in June 1812 also required that all land in the territory not belonging to private individuals or to the government for military purposes was reserved for schools. In January 1817, the legislature of the Missouri Territory voted to create a Board of Trustees to manage all land and property designated to be used for schools in St. Louis. The Board also was given the power to employ teachers and create regulations for the schools. The first chairman of the Board was William Clark, and its first meeting was held in April 1817. In his role as chairman, Clark repeatedly wrote to President James Monroe requesting that Monroe identify land used for military purposes so that other land could be used for schools. After several exchanges between local military leaders, Clark, and President Monroe, in 1817 the federal government relinquished its claim to all land except for a small part, and further relinquished that area in 1824. Starting in 1817, the Board of Trustees began leasing its lands to provide income for future schools.

In 1833, the Missouri General Assembly established a second governing body for St. Louis schools, which first met on April 18 of that year. This body, known as the Board of Education, continued to lease vacant land to provide income, although some of this money was mismanaged due to inaccurate boundary lines. In December 1833, the Board began to loan out money on interest, but up to that point, no money had been appropriated for the purposes of an actual school. For the next four years, the Board continued to loan money and study school plans, but took no action to build a school. In 1836, the people of St. Louis voted to sell the city's common land and to appropriate 10 percent of the proceeds from the sale toward the establishment of a public school district. From this sale about $15,000 was provided to the Board.

First schools

In July 1837, the board agreed to build two school buildings, known as the North School and the South School, respectively located at the northeast corner of Broadway and Martin Luther King Boulevard (then Cherry Street) and at the southwest corner of 4th and Spruce streets. In December, the board met to purchase supplies and to interview potential teachers, and by March 1838, they had selected two candidates, David Armstrong and Miss M.H. Salisbury. The South School, later named Laclede Primary School, opened on April 1, 1838, with Edward Leavy and Sarah Hardy as co-principals. A third school, later named Benton School, opened in January 1842 at the northwest corner of 6th and Locust. The North School, for which the Board initially could not find a teacher, was abandoned and sold shortly after construction of Benton School due to the encroachment of a nearby market.

With the growth of the city, the school building campaign continued at a rapid pace. Between 1840 and 1860, more than twenty new schools were built by the Board, while several others occupied rented space. Among these new schools was the first high school in St. Louis, which opened inside Benton School in February 1853. Approximately 70 students enrolled in the school, and its first principal was Jeremiah D. Low. Courses offered included higher arithmetic, grammar and composition, basic and advanced algebra, geometry, trigonometry, surveying, navigation, and the Latin and German languages. The high school proved very popular among all social classes, and it encouraged attendance at lower level schools. After two years of construction, the first high school building, known as Central High School, opened on Olive Street in July 1855.

In 1848 William Greenleaf Eliot, the Unitarian clergyman in Saint Louis, was elected chair of the school board. He had a passion for creating schools. He and his congregants worked on a campaign to fund the expanding district. Only weeks after the St. Louis Fire of 1849, St. Louis voters approved a 1/10 percent property tax to support the district, and three years later, the Missouri General Assembly passed a school tax, which set aside 25 percent of state funds for education and provided schools with money depending on their enrollment. During the 1850s, it became a St. Louis school tradition for students at each school to "go a Maying", which was to take an excursion into the countryside. These early field trips were more for recreation than for learning, but school administrators regarded them as healthy trips.

School closed six weeks early in 1861 due to a lack of operating funds and the outbreak of the Civil War. After the Civil War, in 1866, the district opened three schools for African American students.

The St. Louis Public Schools also opened the first public high school for black students west of the Mississippi, Sumner High School, in 1875.

St. Louis Public Schools opened the first public kindergarten in North America in 1873 under the direction of William Torrey Harris, then Superintendent of Schools, and Susan Blow, who had studied the methods of Friedrich Fröbel, the founder of the kindergarten system.

By the end of the 19th century, the district had 95 schools and employed more than 1,600 teachers.

1900s to 1930s
By the 20th century, the population in St. Louis was 575,238. Public school enrollment was 62,797, employing 1,665 teachers in ninety schools.

Another St. Louis first was the Educational Museum, which featured articles purchased from the 1904 World's Fair Palace of Education. The museum opened in 1905, and in 1943 it evolved into the first audiovisual department in the United States.

The public schools continued to grow with the city, opening special open air schools for children at risk for tuberculosis, schools for deaf children and those needing individualized instruction, as well as children with orthopedic disabilities.

The first vocational school had opened in 1868, with two more opening in the 1920s.

In late 1918, the schools were closed for 45 days due to the worldwide flu epidemic, and in the spring of 1919 school days were lengthened in an attempt to recover lost time.

During the Great Depression, special programs such as free milk and lunches, and sewing classes were established to help families and conserve resources; teacher salaries were reduced, construction was postponed, and class sizes were increased.

Students aided the war effort during both World War I and World War II by knitting scarves and socks for soldiers, raising poultry, cultivating victory gardens, collecting scrap metal, and buying war stamps.

1950s to present
By the 1950s a number of new schools were built to ease overcrowding, and in the 1960s, more attention was given to meeting the challenges of urban schools, including racial equality, poverty, overcrowded classrooms, and deteriorating school buildings. The 1956 film A City Decides looked at efforts to desegregate schools in St. Louis, and was nominated for an Academy Award for Best Documentary Short. St. Louis Public Schools attained its peak enrollment of 115,543 students in 1967. The district enrolled 108,770 students in 1960 and 111,233 students in 1970.

Since then, efforts have focused on programs such as magnet schools and the Voluntary Interdistrict Transfer Program which were initiated to provide students with the opportunity to attend racially mixed schools. Metro High School was created as a magnet school for racial integration in the 1970s. Metro High School is ranked as the 220th best public high school in the United States by U.S. News & World Report.

In 2007 the state of Missouri took control of St. Louis Public Schools and stripped them of accreditation. This decision was made due to the poor standardized test scores, graduation rates, leadership, and mismanagement of money. In 2006 SLPS was $25 million in debt and had a graduation rate of approximately 55 percent. Almost 19 percent of students were dropping out and over half of students were scoring below grade level on standardized tests. As a result, the state appointed a board to run the district for 6 years. Over the next decade the district worked to increase test scores, graduation rates and attendance. As a result, St. Louis Public Schools regained accreditation in January 2017. The district had a 72 percent graduation rate, over $19 million surplus, and continually improving test scores.

Demographics
In the 2009–2010 school year, the district had an enrollment of approximately 25,000 students and 2,200 teachers, for a student-teacher ratio of 11.4.

In the 2013–2014 school year, the district increased its enrollment to approximately 25,200. Over 88% of students qualify for free or reduced price lunches. Since 2006, more than 80 percent of the student population has been Black, with 82% in 2013-2014. Concurrent with a decline in the population of the city of St. Louis, the district has seen declining enrollment; since 2006 the district student population has decreased by more than 10,000 students.

Leadership
On March 23, 2007, the Missouri State Board of Education ended its accreditation of the St. Louis Public Schools and simultaneously created a new management structure for the district. A three-person Special Administrative Board (SAB) was created, with members selected by the Missouri governor, the mayor of St. Louis, and the president of the St. Louis Board of Aldermen. The current board had authority to operate the district through 2013. The local school board remains in place but has no administrative authority over the district. The current superintendent of the St. Louis Public Schools is Kelvin Adams, who was selected by the Special Administrative Board in 2008. The St. Louis City Board of Education, despite lack of governance, still holds regular elections, with the eventual return of local control in mind. The current seven member elected board consists of Donna Jones, Bill Haas, Katie Wessling, Susan Jones, Charli Cooksey, Dorothy Rohde Collins, and Natalie Vowell.

Special Administrative Board members
 Rick Sullivan
 Darnetta Clinkscale
 Richard Gaines

Superintendents

 George K. Budd (1839)
 Vacant (1840)
 Henry Pearson (1841–1842)
 Vacant (1843–1847)
 Edward M. Avery (1848–1849)
 Spencer Smith (1850–1851)
 John H. Tice (interim) (1851–1852)
 A. Litton (1852–1853)
 Charles A. Putnam (1853)
 John H. Tice (1854–1857)
 Ira Divoll (1857–1868)
 William Torrey Harris (1867–1880)
 Edward H. Long (1880–1895)
 Frank Louis Soldan (1895–1908)
 Ben Blewett (1908–1917)
 Carl G. Rathman (interim) (1917)
 John W. Withers (1917–1921)
 John J. Maddox (1921–1929)
 Henry J. Gerling (1929–1940)
 George L. Hawkins (interim) (1940)
 Homer W. Anderson (1940–1942)
 Philip J. Hickey (1942–1963)
 William Kottmeyer (1963–1970)
 Clyde Miller (interim) (1970–1971)
 Ernest Jones (interim) (1971–1972)
 Clyde Miller (1972–1974)
 Ernest Jones (interim) (1975)
 Robert Wentz (1975–1982)
 Ronald Stodghill (interim) (1982–1983)
 Jerome Jones (1983–1990)
 David J. Mahan (1990–1996)
 Cleveland Hammonds (1996–2003)
 Bill Roberti (2003–2004)
 Floyd Crues (2004)
 Pamela Randall-Hughes (2005)
 Creg Williams (2005–2006)
 Diana Bourisaw (2006–2008)
 John Wright (interim) (2008)
 Kelvin Adams (2008–present)

Schools

Photo gallery

See also

 School gardens and youth education

References

External links
 St. Louis Public Schools
 Employees at Black St. Louis Public Schools, 1925-1955

Annual Reports

 
 
 
 
 
 
 
 
 
 
 
 
 
 
 
 
 
 
 
 
 
 
 
 
 
 
 
 
 
 
 

School districts in Missouri
Education in St. Louis
School districts established in 1838
1838 establishments in Missouri